Seaton Valley was an urban district in Northumberland, England, from 1935 to 1974, at which point it was split between the districts of North Tyneside and Blyth Valley.

It was created by a County Review Order in 1935 from various urban districts near the North Sea coast, particularly Cramlington, most of Earsdon, Seaton Delaval, and Seghill.  Under the Local Government Act 1972 it was abolished on 1 April 1974, with the wards of Backworth, Earsdon and Shiremoor going to the borough of North Tyneside in Tyne and Wear, and the rest going to Blyth Valley in Northumberland.

After the abolition of Blyth Valley district in 2008, a Seaton Valley parish was created. The boundaries of this parish are not identical to the old urban district - excluding Cramlington but including the part of the former borough of Whitley Bay to be included in Blyth Valley in 1974 (Hartley and Seaton Sluice).

References

Districts of England abolished by the Local Government Act 1972
Urban districts of England
History of Northumberland
History of Tyne and Wear